Sonoma County Sol is an American soccer team based in Santa Rosa, California, United States. Founded in 2004, the team plays in the National Premier Soccer League (NPSL), a national amateur league at the fourth tier of the American Soccer Pyramid, in the West Region, Golden Gate Conference.

The team plays its home games at Casa Grande High School. It previously played at Cougar Stadium on the campus of Rancho Cotate High School in nearby Rohnert Park, California.

The team had a sister organization, also called Sonoma County Sol, which played in the Women's Premier Soccer League.

History
After the 2004 season, the MPSL disbanded but a new men's league, the National Premier Soccer League, replaced the previous league and expanded on the territory of the MPSL by adding a Midwestern Division.  The Sol was one of the founding clubs of the NPSL, specifically in the Western Division.  Like the NPSL and its member clubs, the Sol falls under the auspices of the United States Amateur Soccer Association (USASA) and the United States Soccer Federation (USSF).

In 2005, the Sol finished second in the Western Division in the regular season standings, 3 points behind the Sacramento Knights, attaining the number 2 seed in the NPSL West playoffs. In the Western Division playoffs, the Sol beat the number 3 seed Chico Rooks at home in the semi-finals and then traveled to Sacramento to face the Knights in the NPSL West Championship Game.  The Sol triumphed over the Knights in a hard fought match at the soccer stadium at Sacramento State University, garnering the NPSL West Championship.  The Sol then hosted Midwest Champion Detroit Arsenal for the inaugural NPSL National Championship game in Santa Rosa, California.

Also in 2005, the Sol qualified as one of three NPSL West representatives for the Region IV U.S. Open Cup (U.S. Open Cup Website qualifying tournament, where the Sol won its group and then went on to beat the Salinas Valley Samba for the tournament championship and a spot in the USASA National Open Cup.  The Sol would later meet the Samba in Santa Rosa in the first round of the U.S. Open Cup itself.  At the USASA National Open Cup in the August heat of Frisco, Texas, in the semi-finals the Sol faced the AAC Eagles of Chicago who prevailed 2–1.  With this result, the Sol's 2005 campaign came to an end.

In 2006 however, the Sol bounced back and prevailed in the USASA Open Cup.  It started with a road trip to Seattle for the Region VI championships.  The Sol beat out the Chico Rooks (NPSL) in group play to advance to the finals, where they defeated the Suaharos (sp?) 2–1 in the finals.  Beto Sanchez, the back up goalkeeper, was subbed on as a forward due to injuries in the 80th minute, and netted the game winner in the 85th minute on a diving header.  The Sol then traveled to Frisco, TX for the national finals where they defeated the heavily favored (and overrated) home side Dallas Roma FC 3–2 in double over time.  They then went on to defeat the Lightning (Chicago) 1–0 in the finals to claim the USASA National open cup championship.

In 2013, following a first-place finish in the Golden Gate Conference during the regular season, the Sol would advance through the playoffs to the NPSL Championship Final, visiting RVA Football Club, but losing 2–0.

Players

Current squad
Source: 

Coaches
 Head Coach- Vinnie Cortezzo
 Assistant Coach- Tyler Hurst
 Assistant Coach- Tim Maycock

Notable former players
  Eric Kronberg
  Steve Purdy
  Troy Roberts

Year-by-year

Honors

Domestic
National Premier Soccer League
 Winners (1): 2009
 Runner-up (3): 2005, 2013, 2016
Western Regional Champs (Playoff NPSL):
 Winners (6): 2005, 2007, 2008, 2009, 2013, 2016
Northwest Division (NPSL):
 Winners (4): 2007, 2008, 2009, 2013
Golden Gate Conference (NPSL):
 Winners (2):  2015, 2016 Hank Steinbrecher Cup (USASA): Runner-up (1):''' 2014

Hank Steinbrecher Cup

Head coaches
 UAS Hugo PEREZ (2004)
 USA David Shaffer (2005–2006)
  Benjamin Ziemer (2007–2011)
  Mark Carr (2012)
  Vinny Cortezzo (2012–present)

Home Field
 Ernie Nevers Field at Santa Rosa High School; Santa Rosa, California (2004–2010, 2016)
 Seawolf Stadium at Sonoma State University; Rohnert Park, California (2011)
 Cougar Stadium at Rancho Cotate High School; Rohnert Park, California (2012–2015)
 Casa Grande High School Petaluma, California (2017–present)

References

External links

Association football clubs established in 2004
Soccer clubs in the San Francisco Bay Area
National Premier Soccer League teams
Sports in Sonoma County, California
2004 establishments in California